University of Kisubi (UniK), is a private, co-educational, university in Uganda.

Location
The coordinates of UniK's campus are 0°07'14.0"N, 32°31'54.0"E (Latitude:0.120567; Longitude:32.531677).

History
University of Kisubi was established in 2004 by the Brothers of Christian Instruction, as a center of Uganda Martyrs University. In 2009 UniK was made a constituent college of the university. In 2015, it received provisional accreditation to become a separate, independent University. The university held its third graduation ceremony in October 2018.

Faculties
The university had three faculties as of April 2016:

 Faculty of Business and Information Communication Technology
 Faculty of Education
 Faculty of Human and Social Sciences

Academic courses
As of April 2016, UniK offers the following academic courses:

Postgraduate
 Master of Arts in Educational Leadership
 Master of Business Administration
 Master of Science in Clinical & Psychological Counseling
 Master of Information Technology

Undergraduate
 Bachelor of Arts with Education
 Bachelor of Science with Education
 Bachelor of Business Studies with Education
 Bachelor of Business Administration & Management
 Bachelor of Science in Information Technology
 Bachelor of Counseling Psychology
 Bachelor of Science in Rehabilitation Counseling Psychology
 Bachelor of Science in Family and Child Counseling Psychology
 Bachelor of Arts in Human and Religious Studies
 Bachelor of Social Work & Management
 Bachelor of Bio-Medical Laboratory Technology
 Bachelor of Development & Management Studies
 Bachelor of Arts in Economics 
 Bachelor of Economics and Statistics 
 Bachelor of Arts in Human and Religious Studies 
 Bachelor of Art, Fashion and Design 
 Bachelor of Public Relations and Mass Communication 
 Bachelor of Science in Public Health

Diplomas
 Diploma in Business Administration
 Diploma in Information Technology
 Diploma in Counseling Psychology
 Diploma in Bio Medical Laboratory Technology
 Diploma in Business Management
 Diploma in Public Health 
 Diploma in Social Work and Social Administration

Certificates
 Certificate in Business Administration
 Certificate in Information Technology
 Certificate in Counseling
 Certificate in Social Work and Social Administration 
 Certificate in Music 
 Certificate in Swahili 
 Certificate in English Proficiency

See also
 Education in Uganda
 List of universities in Uganda
 Central Region, Uganda
 List of university leaders in Uganda

References

External links
 Webpage of University of Kisubi

Universities and colleges in Uganda
Educational institutions established in 2004
Education in Uganda
Wakiso District
2004 establishments in Uganda